"One Horse Town" is the second single released by Irish band the Thrills from their debut album, So Much for the City (2003). It was released on 10 March 2003 and reached number seven on the Irish Singles Chart, becoming the band's highest-charting song in their home country. It also peaked at number 18 on the UK Singles Chart.

Track listing

Charts

Weekly charts

Year-end charts

References

2003 singles
The Thrills songs
Virgin Records singles